"Rattlesnake Shake" is a song by British rock group Fleetwood Mac, written by guitarist Peter Green, which first appeared on the band's 1969 album Then Play On. The track was considered the high point of its parent album, and was one of the band's crowd-favorites in the late 1960s.

Background
Although "Oh Well" was a hit in the UK, the song was not the group's first single released in the United States. Instead, Clifford Davis, who was Fleetwood Mac's manager at the time, selected "Rattlesnake Shake" to be released in the US since he thought it would become a big hit, but it did not chart anywhere. After the commercial failure of "Rattlesnake Shake", "Oh Well" was released as the second single, and subsequently became a hit on both sides of the Atlantic. Mick Fleetwood ranked the song in his top 11 favorite Fleetwood Mac songs of all-time list since he was able to participate in bringing out the character of the song.

According to Mick Fleetwood, the double-time shuffle near the end of the song was spun out of an improvised jam. "It incorporated the freedom to go off on a tangent, to jam – the classic ‘Do you jam, dude?’ We learned that as players. You hear that alive and well in the double-time structure that I put in at the end, which on stage could last half an hour. It was our way of being in The Grateful Dead."

In a Q&A, Peter Green admitted that "Rattlesnake Shake" was about masturbation, reckoning that the lyrical content was inspired by Fleetwood. Fleetwood would later back up this claim in his 2014 autobiography "Play On", stating that "Rattlesnake Shake" is an ode to masturbation as a cure for the blues. "I'm named in it, as a guy who does the rattlesnake shake to jerk away my sadness whenever I don't have a chick. That was an appropriate immortalisation of my younger self..." To achieve the rustling noises heard at the end of each chorus, Green found it appropriate to insert the sounds of an actual rattlesnake found on an audio tape.

Critical reception
The song has been well-received; the magazine Rolling Stone hailed the track as Peter Green's best song along with "Albatross". Ultimate Classic Rock placed it at #7 on their Top 10 'Peter Green Fleetwood Mac Songs' list. Paste Magazine also ranked the song number #19 on the 20 Best Fleetwood Mac Songs Of All Time, and was just one of two Peter Green songs to appear on the list, the other being "Oh Well".

Personnel
Fleetwood Mac
Peter Green – guitar, vocals
Danny Kirwan – electric guitar
John McVie – bass guitar
Mick Fleetwood - drums, handclaps

Cover versions
A different recording of "Rattlesnake Shake" also appears on Mick Fleetwood's solo album, The Visitor. Released in 1981, this recording featured Peter Green, the track's composer, on guitar and vocals. During this time, Peter Green was beginning to reemerge professionally and had released a series of solo albums. Unlike the 1969 original, the rerecorded 1981 version did manage to chart, peaking at #30 on the Mainstream Rock chart.

Also in 1981, Bob Welch recorded a live version of the track on his album Live at The Roxy, with contributions from Stevie Nicks (tambourine), Christine McVie (maracas), Mick Fleetwood (drums), Robbie Patton (cowbell), Alvin Taylor (guitar), Robin Sylvester (bass), Joey Brasler (guitar), and David Adelstein (keyboards). The album was released in 2004.

A 1973 live version of "Rattlesnake Shake" appeared on Aerosmith box set "Pandora's Box" in 1991.

In 2005, former Fleetwood Mac guitarist Rick Vito covered "Rattlesnake Shake" on an album of the same name.

In 2008, the Mick Fleetwood Blues Band recorded a live version of "Rattlesnake Shake" for their album "Blue Again!". This version featured Rick Vito on guitar and vocals.

Five years later, the song was rehearsed for a Mick Fleetwood Blues Band concert. Christine McVie had given Mick Fleetwood a call and asked him if she could play at an upcoming gig in Hawaii, to which Fleetwood agreed. The same day, Fleetwood and Rick Vito brought a piano to her hotel suite and rehearsed "Don't Stop" and "Rattlesnake Shake". On the night of the gig, Mick Fleetwood alluded to a special guest, without announcing the special guest was Christine McVie. In addition to the aforementioned songs, they also played "Get Like You Used to Be" and "World Turning".

Personnel (Mick Fleetwood version)
Peter Green – vocals, lead guitar
Mick Fleetwood – drums, percussion
Richard Dashut – percussion
George Hawkins – bass guitar
Todd Sharp – guitar
Lord Tiki – hand drums
Tony Todaro – percussion
The Clapettes – percussion
Ebaali Gbiko – percussion, backing vocals

Charts

References

1969 songs
Songs written by Peter Green (musician)
Fleetwood Mac songs
Reprise Records singles